The Royal Australian Air Force Institute of Aviation Medicine (AVMED) ensures the effectiveness and safety of Australian Defence Forces (ADF) air operations by conducting research and training ADF aircrew to understand and manage the physiological challenges of flight. AVMED is currently staffed by a mixture of uniformed (RAAF and Army) and civilian personnel bringing with them diverse skills in aviation medicine, human factors, and life support.

The main functions of AVMED include:
 Aviation medicine training for aircrew, aviation-related personnel and health specialist officers.
 Aviation medicine research, development, testing and evaluation.
 Human factors in aviation.
 Central Aircrew Medical Fitness Boards and aircrew applicant medical evaluations.
 Aviation medicine consultancy services.
 An aviation medicine library.

AVMED is located at RAAF Base Edinburgh in Adelaide, South Australia.

See also
RAF Institute of Aviation Medicine

References
Air Force News: Into the future

Military units and formations of the Royal Australian Air Force
Aviation medicine organizations
Aviation research institutes
Medical units and formations of Australia
Military medical training establishments